In the run up to the 2019 Polish parliamentary election, various organisations carry out opinion polling to gauge voting intention in Poland. Results of such polls are displayed in this article.

The date range for these opinion polls are from the previous parliamentary election, held on 25 October 2015, to the election day of 13 October 2019.

Graphical summary

Poll results

Poll results are listed in the tables below in reverse chronological order, showing the most recent first, and using the date the survey's fieldwork was done, as opposed to the date of publication. If such date is unknown, the date of publication is given instead. The highest percentage figure in each polling survey is displayed in bold, and the background shaded in the leading party's colour. In the instance that there is a tie, then no figure is shaded. The lead column on the right shows the percentage-point difference between the two parties with the highest figures. When a specific poll does not show a data figure for a party, the party's cell corresponding to that poll is shown empty.

2019

Electoral alliances

Parties

2018

2017

2016

2015

Alternative scenarios 
Some polls gauge voting intention in case an electoral coalition is created by two or more opposition parties.

Seat projections

Notes

References

External links 
 Parlamentarny.pl - List of all polls

2019